Zevegiin Oidov (born May 25, 1949) is a retired Mongolian wrestler. At the 1976 Summer Olympics he won the silver medal in the freestyle -62 kg class.  He also won two world champion titles, in 1974 and 1975 in the -62 kg class. In 1977 competing in the freestyle -68 kg class he came in second, taking the Bronze medal.

Other Olympic appearances 
In 1972 he competed in the Munich games in the -62 kg Freestyle class under the name Oidov, Zeveg where he was eliminated after the second round in which his opponent was Abdulbekov, Zagalav of the URS who went on to win the Gold Medal.
His final Olympic appearance was the 1980 Moscow games where he competed in the -68 kg Freestyle class under the name of Oidov, Zevegying and was eliminated after the third round.

See also 
 Wrestling at the 1976 Summer Olympics

References

External links
 
 
 
 

1949 births
Living people
People from Övörkhangai Province
Mongolian male sport wrestlers
Olympic wrestlers of Mongolia
Olympic medalists in wrestling
Olympic silver medalists for Mongolia
Wrestlers at the 1972 Summer Olympics
Wrestlers at the 1976 Summer Olympics
Medalists at the 1976 Summer Olympics
Wrestlers at the 1980 Summer Olympics
Asian Games medalists in wrestling
Asian Games gold medalists for Mongolia
Asian Games silver medalists for Mongolia
Wrestlers at the 1974 Asian Games
Medalists at the 1974 Asian Games
Wrestlers at the 1978 Asian Games
Medalists at the 1978 Asian Games
World Wrestling Champions
World Wrestling Championships medalists
21st-century Mongolian people
20th-century Mongolian people